Alex Mukulu is a Ugandan playwright.

Life
Mukulu was born in 1954 in Misebe (Ssingo County), Buganda, to Paulo Kayizi Lugaizi and Victoria Ndagire, daughter of Prince Yokana Kimbugwe of Lungujja. After Kololo Secondary School, he studied Film and Drama at Makerere University, Kampala, Uganda. 
His most well-known plays include “30 Year of Bananas”, “Wounds of Africa” and “Guest of Honour”. 
“Journey to Self-Realization” was performed at the opening ceremony of the Commonwealth Heads of Government Meeting held in Kampala in 2007.

Works

Plays
 “Muzukulu wa Kabangala”  (produced 1977)
 “Engule ya Kamukukulu” (produced 1978 )
 “Springs of Tears” (produced 1979)
 “The Cigarette” (produced 1980)
 “Opera Bakisimba” (produced 1980)
 “Twin Opera” (produced 1980)
 “The Celebrity” (produced 1983)
 “I killed the Archbishop” (produced 1984)
 “Gwanga Mujje” (produced 1985)
 “Mbasalidde ga Nkolwa” (produced 1985)
 “Stop it with 11 men” (produced 1986) 
 “Liberator kid” (produced 1987)
 “The Drunkards” (produced 1986/7)
 “Wounds of Africa” (produced 1988)
 “Peasants Cry”  (produced 1989)
 “30 years of Bananas” (produced 1991)
 “Excuse me Mzungu” (produced 1992)
 “The Guest of Honour” (produced 1994)
 “Seven workers of Uganda” (produced 1995)
 “Radio Mambo Bado” (produced 1996)
 “A good Muganda case” (produced 2021)
  “The People`s President (produced 2022)
 “Journey to Self-Realization” (performed at the opening ceremony of the Commonwealth Heads of Governments Meeting, held in Kampala, 2007)

Books
30 Years of Bananas, Alex Mukulu, Oxford University Press, 1993

References

Ugandan dramatists and playwrights
Makerere University alumni
Living people
Year of birth missing (living people)